Taourirt (Berber: Tawrirt, ⵜⴰⵡⵔⵉⵔⵜ) is a town in Taourirt Province in the northern part of Morocco. Situated in the Oriental region about 100 km west to the city of Oujda.

The town is important as a transport link: the main east-west railway from Casablanca - Rabat - Fez in the west to Oujda in the east runs through Taourirt. Also bus lines running from several cities in the Nador province (including the city of Nador) make a stop in the town.

The new branch line of the Moroccan railways running from Taourirt to Nador opened in 2009. This line runs alongside the existing road, through the mountains, to Nador.

Taourirt is also known because of its ancient Kasbah.

Notable people 
Moha El Yaagoubi - former international footballer

Gallery

References

Populated places in Taourirt Province
Municipalities of Morocco
Provincial capitals in Morocco